Milton is a town in Cabell County, West Virginia, United States. The population was 2,831 at the 2020 census.

Milton is a part of the Huntington-Ashland, WV-KY-OH Metropolitan Statistical Area (MSA).

History
The town was named after Milton Reece, the original owner of the town site.

Historic sites
Milton is noted for the historic Mud River Covered Bridge across the nearby Mud River.  In 2002, the covered bridge was moved to nearby Pumpkin Park. It was listed on the National Register of Historic Places in 1975. The town is also known for Blenko Glass, which is across the street from Pumpkin Park.

The former Morris Memorial Hospital for Crippled Children was listed on the National Register of Historic Places in 2013.

Geography
Milton is located along the Mud River.

Demographics

2010 census
As of the census of 2010, there were 2,423 people, 1,132 households, and 666 families living in the town. The racial makeup of the town was 97.6% White, 0.7% African American, 0.1% Asian, 0.5% from other races, and 1.0% from two or more races. Hispanic or Latino of any race were 1.0% of the population.

There were 1,132 households, of which 25.6% had children under the age of 18 living with them, 42.2% were married couples living together, 12.4% had a female householder with no husband present, 4.2% had a male householder with no wife present, and 41.2% were non-families. 36.0% of all households were made up of individuals, and 17.8% had someone living alone who was 65 years of age or older. The average household size was 2.14 and the average family size was 2.76.

The median age in the town was 42.2 years. 20.5% of residents were under the age of 18; 7.6% were between the ages of 18 and 24; 24.8% were from 25 to 44; 28.4% were from 45 to 64; and 18.5% were 65 years of age or older. The gender makeup of the town was 46.7% male and 53.3% female.

2000 census
As of the census of 2000, there were 2,206 people, 1,010 households, and 628 families living in the town. The population density was 1,400.0 inhabitants per square mile (539.1/km2). There were 1,116 housing units at an average density of 708.2 per square mile (272.7/km2). The racial makeup of the town was 99.23% White, 0.45% African American, 0.05% Native American, 0.05% Asian, 0.09% from other races, and 0.14% from two or more races. Hispanic or Latino of any race were 0.68% of the population.

There were 1,010 households, out of which 28.4% had children under the age of 18 living with them, 45.8% were married couples living together, 13.3% had a female householder with no husband present, and 37.8% were non-families. 34.2% of all households were made up of individuals, and 16.5% had someone living alone who was 65 years of age or older. The average household size was 2.18 and the average family size was 2.78.

In the town, the population was spread out, with 21.6% under the age of 18, 9.2% from 18 to 24, 27.6% from 25 to 44, 22.6% from 45 to 64, and 19.0% who were 65 years of age or older. The median age was 39 years. For every 100 females there were 87.4 males. For every 100 females age 18 and over, there were 83.8 males.

The median income for a household in the town was $29,348, and the median income for a family was $31,786. Males had a median income of $31,003 versus $19,457 for females. The per capita income for the town was $15,384. About 16.6% of families and 17.4% of the population were below the poverty line, including 28.2% of those under age 18 and 8.3% of those age 65 or over.

Arts and culture

The Mountaineer Opry House, which has since been removed, featured bluegrass music on Saturday nights. Milton also has an extensive Flea Market covering a couple of acres (including parking) with both indoor and outdoor stalls.

Milton hosts the county fair of Cabell County, West Virginia. Milton is also noted for its annual Pumpkin Festival, held in early October.

Education 
Milton is served by the schools of the Cabell County Board of Education. Primary education is given at Milton Elementary, while middle school students attend Milton Middle School. High school students attend Cabell Midland High School, which opened in August 1994 upon the consolidation of Milton High School and Barboursville High School.

Notable people
Katie Lee, food critic, former wife of Billy Joel, was raised in Milton.
Breece D'J Pancake, short story author, was raised in Milton.
Phillip Swann, known professionally as Phil Swann, singer, songwriter, actor, author, playwright, record producer, was raised in Milton.

References

Towns in Cabell County, West Virginia